Krasninsky (masculine), Krasninskaya (feminine), or Krasninskoye (neuter) may refer to:
Krasninsky District, name of several districts in Russia
Krasninsky (rural locality) (Krasninskaya, Krasninskoye), name of several rural localities in Russia